María Francisca Gavilán Valladares (born 27 June 1973) is a Chilean film, theater, and television actress and singer.

Acting career
In this academy she was a student of Luz Jiménez, who has been one of her main artistic influences. She also counts as influences Tamara Acosta – who was her partner at theater school and on the cast of Los Pincheira and Papi Ricky – Amparo Noguera, and Paulina Urrutia.

In 2007 she returned to Canal 13 to play Andrea Kuntz on the series Papi Ricky, and in 2010 she played a small role on the series Los 80.

In cinema she has acted in the films Monos con navaja (2000), Ulysses (2010), and in 2011 she was the protagonist of the Violeta Parra biopic Violeta Went to Heaven, directed by Andrés Wood.

Musical career
In Violeta Went to Heaven, Gavilán interpreted the songs of Parra sung in the movie.

In 2016 she appeared on the program  with La Regia Orquesta, where she performed songs by Parra and from the musical .

Filmography

TV serials

TV series

Theater
 Hedda Gabler (directed by Claudia di Girolamo)
 Lady marginal (directed by Claudia di Girolamo)
  (directed by Claudia di Girolamo)
 Mina antipersonal (directed by Claudia di Girolamo)
 La cocinita (directed by Fernándo Villalobos)
 Restos Humanos y la Verdadera Naturaleza del Amor (directed by Francisco Melo)
 Sonata de otoño (directed by Carla Acchiardi)
 Mun Chile (directed by Rodrigo Achondo)
 NN.29.10 (directed by Rodrigo Achondo)
 La Condición Humana (directed by Mateo Iribarren)
 Ma vie de Chandell (directed by )
 Provincia Kapital (directed by )
 Cartas a Tomás (directed by Rodrigo Pérez)
 Carita de Emperaora (directed by Felipe Hurtado)
 Handicam (directed by Eduardo Pávez Goye)
 Libres (directed by Francisco Melo)
 Doña Rosita the Spinster (directed by Héctor Noguera)
 The Broken Jug (directed by Francisco Pérez-Bannen)

Awards
 Pedro Sienna Award: Best Female Leading Performance (Violeta Went to Heaven)
 Huelva Film Festival: Colón de Plata for Best Film Actress (Violeta Went to Heaven)
 Lima Film Festival: Special Mention – Best Actress (Violeta Went to Heaven)
 2012 Altazor Award for Best Film Actress (Violeta Went to Heaven)
 2012 : Best Film Actress (Violeta Went to Heaven)
 2013 Altazor Award: Best Television Actress

References

External links

 

1973 births
21st-century Chilean actresses
Actresses from Santiago
21st-century Chilean women singers
Chilean film actresses
Chilean stage actresses
Chilean telenovela actresses
Living people
Singers from Santiago